Jelin-e Sofla (also Romanized as Jelīn-e Soflá; also known as Jelīn-e Pā’īn) is a village in Estarabad-e Jonubi Rural District, in the Central District of Gorgan County, Golestan Province, Iran. At the 2006 census, its population was 526, in 120 families.

References 

Populated places in Gorgan County